Pseudonebularia cingulata is a species of sea snail, a marine gastropod mollusk, in the family Mitridae, the miters or miter snails.

References

cingulata
Gastropods described in 1853